Summit Helicopters is a Canadian aviation company that provides charter services throughout remote areas of western and northern Canada as well as the United Kingdom and Indonesia. Summit Helicopters is a member of the Ledcor Group of Companies and is a sister company to Summit Air.

Summit Helicopters operates 6 different types of helicopters, all equipped with "onboard satellite phone, portable phone, next generation satellite tracking, and Transport Canada approved medevac kit." Depending on the service, required optional equipment includes "wildlife antennae, camera mounts, utility baskets, and emergency and fixed floats".

History 
The Det'on Cho Corporation and three Yellowknife residents, Rob Carroll, Kevin Lang and Geoff Furniss, founded Trinity Helicopters in 2009. They quickly grew to a fleet of 17 helicopters operating in all three northern Canadian territories.

In January 2013, Ledcor Air Limited, a member of the Ledcor Group of Companies, purchased Trinity Helicopters and subsequently renamed the company Summit Helicopters.

Summit acquired CC Helicopters of Kamloops in 2014. CC Helicopters had over 30 years of experience in the British Columbia Interior and operated a fleet of light, intermediate, and medium helicopters with instrument flight rules (IFR) and visual flight rules (VFR) crews based at Kamloops Airport and Lillooet Airport. CC Helicopters also specialized in BC Air Ambulance medevac, oil and gas exploration and support, forestry survey and protection, environmental and wildlife survey, and power line support.

In addition to its headquarters in Yellowknife, Summit Helicopters now operates out of five bases: Kamloops, Terrace, Fort McMurray, Lillooet, and Norman Wells (Norman Wells Airport).

Fleet 
As of March 2016, Summit Helicopters has the following aircraft registered with Transport Canada (TC).

References

Helicopter airlines
Companies based in Yellowknife
Airlines established in 2013
Canadian companies established in 2013
Regional airlines of the Northwest Territories
Charter airlines of Canada